"Dođi" is a single by Bosnian singer-songwriter Dino Merlin and Slovenian singer-songwriter Senidah. It was released on 1 January 2021 by Magaza Sarajevo and Croatia Records as the second single off Merlin's upcoming twelfth studio album. It was written solely by Merlin, and produced by Adis Sirbubalo. Lyrically, the song deals with loneliness, insecurity and anxiety. Accompanying music video was premiered during the last hours of 2020.

Background and release 
Rumours about Merlin and Senidah collaborating first broke out ahead of 2020 Music Awards Ceremony. When asked about it on the ceremony red carpet, Senidah denied the rumours.

Several months later, media reported about Merlin and Senidah filming the music video for their collaborative song in Istanbul, which Senidah once again denied, saying that she had never been in Turkey in her life. It was soon revealed that Merlin had finished recording his twelfth studio album, which was planned to be released in June.

In June 2020, media reported that the filming of the music video, set in Skenderija, Sarajevo, was halted by new COVID-19 pandemic measures.

In October 2020, Merlin released the lead single off the album, titled "Mi" (Us), to widespread critical acclaim and commercial success. On 18 December 2020, it was announced that Merlin would hold a virtual concert on New Year's Eve night, sponsored by BH Telecom and Samsung. On 29 December, both Merlin and Senidah took to Instagram to share a snippet of the music video and announce the release date.

Writing and recording 
The song was written after Merlin's  Hotel Nacional Tour:

After long and exhausting Hotel Nacional Tour, I tried to find my peace, to take a break from the world and the people, so I decided to travel to a certain big city where I tried to come back to myself while running away from everyone else, only to find out that – I don't know how to be alone. That's how the first lyrics of this song were written, and Senidah was a perfect partner for this duet, as an echo and another voice.

When asked about the song, Senidah, who is known to idolize Merlin, stated:

A collaboration with Dino is a dream come true to me, it means everything to me, my heart is full when I listen to our voices together. I proved to myself once again that everything, that I want with my entire being and soul, is possible. This is real proof and motivation for the future. Nothing is impossible and now I feel free to continue dreaming.

Music video 
The music video was released during last hours of 2020. It was uploaded to Merlin's YouTube channel during his virtual concert. It was directed by Slovenian artist Kukla (stylized as КУКЛА) and filmed in Sarajevo and Lukomir.

When asked about the filming, Senidah stated:

This year was definitely different for all of us, time passed strangely and strange things occurred. We split the filming in several stages, and our energy would spread and strengthen every time. I also discovered gorgeous landscapes in Bosnia, met lovely people, and Dino kept me safe and made sure I didn't miss anything. 

Within less of two hours, the music video accumulated more than 200,000 views.

Awards and nominations

Track listing

Credits and personnel

Track
Dino Merlin – lead vocals, music, lyrics, production
Senidah – lead vocals
Adis Sirbubalo – arrangement, programming, keyboards
Bojan Šalamon – additional programming, mixing
Dino Šukalo – guitars
Istanbul Strings – orchestration
Mert Kemancı – orchestra arrangement
Altuğ Öncü – oud
Maya Sar – backing vocals
Aida Mušanović Arsić – backing vocals
Anže Kacafura – recording, editing
Mahir Sarihodžić – recording, editing, mixing
Ozan Bayraşa – recording, editing
Chris Gehringer – mastering
Mixed at Long Play Studio, Sarajevo and Rubikon Sound Factory, Zagreb
Mastered at Sterling Sound, Edgewater

Charts

References 

2021 songs
Slovenian songs
Songs written by Dino Merlin